Nesbit is an unincorporated community in DeSoto County, Mississippi, United States.

History
A post office operated under the name Nesbits Station from 1869 to 1881 and began operating under the name Nesbit in 1881.

In the early 1900s, an academy, two churches, and a sawmill were located in Nesbit.

Nesbit is located on the former Illinois Central Railroad.

Geography

Climate

Notable people
Kenny Brown, blues guitarist (born 1953; grew up in Nesbit)
Mississippi Joe Callicott, blues singer and guitarist (1899-1969; was born and lived in Nesbit)
Olivia Holt, teen actress on TV series Kickin' It (born 1997)
Jerry Lee Lewis, musician

References

Unincorporated communities in DeSoto County, Mississippi
Unincorporated communities in Mississippi
Memphis metropolitan area